Maariv or Maʿariv, also known as Arvit, is a Jewish prayer service held in the evening or night. It consists primarily of the evening Shema and Amidah.

The service will often begin with two verses from Psalms, followed by the communal recitation of Barechu. The three paragraphs of the Shema are then said, both preceded and followed by two blessings, although sometimes a fifth blessing is added at the end. The hazzan (leader) then recites half-Kaddish. The Amidah is said quietly by everyone, and, unlike at the other services, is not repeated by the hazzan. The chazzan recites the full Kaddish, Aleinu is recited, and the mourners' Kaddish ends the service; some recite another Psalm or Psalms before or after Aleinu. Other prayers occasionally added include the Counting of the Omer (between Passover and Shavuot) and (in many communities) Psalm 27 (between the first of Elul and the end of Sukkot).

Maariv is generally recited after sunset, however, it may be recited as early as one and a quarter seasonal hours before sunset. This is common only on Friday nights, in order to begin Shabbat earlier. At the conclusion of Shabbat and holidays, the service is usually delayed until nightfall. While Maariv should be prayed before midnight, it may be recited until daybreak or even sunrise.

Etymology
The word Maariv is the first significant word in the opening blessing of the evening service. It is derived from the Hebrew word erev, which translates to evening. Maariv is a conversion of this word into a verb, which means "bringing on evening."  The name comes from the end of the first blessing of the prayer, "Blessed are you, O Lord, who brings on the evenings." Arvit is the adjective form of this word, roughly translated as "of the evening". It shares the same etymological root as maghrib, the Islamic sunset prayer.

Origin
Maariv is said to correspond to the evening observances in the Holy Temple. Although there were no sacrifices brought at night, any animal parts which were not burned during the day could be offered at night. Since this was not always necessary, the evening prayer was declared to be optional as well. However, the Jews long ago accepted it as an obligation, so it is now considered to be mandatory. However, there remain some vestiges of its original voluntary status; for example, the Amidah is not repeated by the leader, unlike by all other prayers (an exception being on the Sabbath, when the leader recites an abbreviated repetition, see below).

Another explanation is that as the third prayer, Maariv corresponds to Jacob, the third patriarch. The Talmud understands this to mean that Jacob prayed at night, and hence instituted Maariv. Some suggest that he first started reciting the prayer after he fled from his homeland, and as a result, the prayer service has become associated with trust in God.

Time

Generally, the time when Maariv can first be recited is when the time for reciting Mincha ends. But there are varying opinions on this. Maariv should not begin before 1¼ hours before sunset. Others delay Maariv until after sunset or after dusk. If Maariv is recited prior to dusk, the Shema is repeated later in the evening.

Back-to-back Mincha and Maariv
In many congregations, the afternoon and evening prayers are recited back-to-back, to save people having to attend synagogue twice. The Vilna Gaon discouraged this practice, and followers of his set of customs commonly wait until after nightfall to recite Ma'ariv, since the name derives from the word "nightfall".

On Shabbat
On the eve of Shabbat, some have the custom to recite the Maariv prayer earlier than usually, generally during Pelag Hamincha (1¼ hours before sunset). This is in order to fulfill the precept of adding from the weekday to the holiness of Shabbat. However, this is too early for the recitation of Shema, so Shema should be repeated later under these circumstances.

Prayers included

Introductory prayers
In some communities, these verses are proceeded by Psalm 134, a few assorted verses, and a half Kaddish.

Shema
The first main part of the service is focused on the Shema Yisrael'''.

In a congregation, Barechu, the formal public call to prayer, is recited. Then come two benedictions, one praising God for creating the cycle of day and night, and one thanking God for the Torah.

The three passages of the Shema are then recited.

Two more benedictions are recited. The first praises God for taking the Jews out of Egypt, and the second prays for protection during the night. Ashkenazim outside of Israel (except some chasidim such as Chabad-Lubavitch and followers of the Vilna Gaon) and Italian Jews then add another blessing (Baruch Adonai L'Olam), which is made mostly from a tapestry of biblical verses. However, this is omitted on Shabbat and holidays, and by some at the conclusion of those days and on Chol HaMoed. This prayer is also said by Baladi Temanim in and out of Israel, albeit combined with the last blessing. It is also recited in an abbreviated form at the conclusion of the Sabbath by some Moroccan Jews.

On Shabbat and holidays, some congregations recite relevant verses at this point.

On Festivals, some Ashkenazic communities recite piyyutim called Ma'arivim during the blessings of Shema.  In the past, this was also done in the Italian Nusach and the Romaiote rite.

Amidah
This is followed by the Shemoneh Esreh (Amidah). Half Kaddish is recited just before the Amidah, in order to separate between the required Shema and the (originally) optional Amidah. The Amidah is followed by the full Kaddish (sometime with additions recited beforehand, see below).

Unlike in other prayers, the Amidah is not repeated aloud by the chazzan in Maariv.

Concluding prayers
Sephardim (and, in Israel, most who follow Nusach Sefard) then say Psalm 121 (or another topical Psalm), say the Mourner's Kaddish and repeat Barechu,  before concluding with the Aleinu. Ashkenazim, in the diaspora, neither say Psalm 121 nor repeat Barechu, but conclude with Aleinu followed by the Mourner's Kaddish (in Israel, most Ashkenazim do repeat Barechu after mourner's Kaddish).

From the beginning of Elul through Hoshanah Rabbah (and outside of Israel, on Shemini Atzeret as well), most Nusach Ashkenaz communities recite Psalm 27, which contains many allusions to the Days of Awe and Sukkot. This is again followed by the mourner's Kaddish.  In a house of mourning, many communities conclude the service with Psalm 16 or Psalm 49. In the Western Ashkenazic rite (as well as some German and Hungarian communities following the Eastern Ashkenazic rite), Psalms 24, 8 and 28 are recited when maariv is recited after nightfall; these can be followed by a Mourners Kaddish if needed (since these communities usually only allow one mourner to recite each Kaddish).

Additions

Friday night
Although these verses were already said during the Amidah (and will be recited yet again during Kiddush at home) they are repeated. This is because when Shabbat coincides with a holiday, the Amidah does not include the passage.

The three verses are followed by the Seven-Faceted Blessing. This is a single blessing designed to summarize the seven blessings of the Amidah, for those who came late. While originally this was said only by the leader, it is now customary in most Ashkenazic communities (except for those who follow the practices of the Vilna Gaon) for the congregation to recite the middle part before the leader does so or together with the leader. In the most communities of the Eastern Ashkenazic rite as well as many Sephardic communities, this blessing is omitted on the first night of Passover, because that is considered a "time of protection"; in the Western Ashkenazic rite as well as some other communities, it is recited as normal.

In communities that did not recite ba-meh madlikin before maariv, it is recited after the full Kaddish. Many communities also recite kiddush at this point.

After Shabbat 
During the Maariv service following Shabbat, several additions are made.

Many communities recite (usually sing) Psalm 144 and Psalm 67.

A paragraph called "Ata Chonantanu" is inserted into the fourth blessing of the Amidah. The recitation of this paragraph officially ends Shabbat. One who forgets to recite this paragraph may also end Shabbat through Havdalah or by saying the words "Blessed is He Who differentiates between the holy and the secular."

Two sections of prayers, "Vayehi Noam" (the last verse from Psalm 90, followed by the full Psalm 91) and V'Ata Kadosh (all but the first two verses of Uva Letzion), are added to the service. These prayers are recited out of mercy for the wicked. The wicked are given a reprieve from Gehinnom during Shabbat, and the reprieve continues until all evening prayers following Shabbat are concluded. In Nusach Ashkenaz and Nusach Sefard, these verses are only recited if there are a full six days of work in the upcoming week; if there is a major festival falling in the middle of the week, they are omitted. If the first day of Passover falls the following Sabbath, customs very as to whether the Eve of Passover, generally considered a minor holiday, is enough to exempt the recitation of these verses.

Nusach Ashkenaz and Italian Nusach also add "Veyiten Lecha" (whereas Nusach Sefard and most Sfardim say this at home after Havdala).  These are verses of blessing, that we pray should be fulfilled over the course of the week.  These are recited even when 'Vayehi Noam' is omitted, but it is omitted when Tisha Bav falls at the conclusion of the Sabbath.

In some communities, Havdalah is also recited at this point.

Counting of the Omer

During the seven weeks from the second night of Passover until (but not including) Shavuot, the day is counted. This is usually done during Maariv, just before Aleinu. Others postpone the counting until the end of the service. If it is not yet nightfall, many congregations leave the counting to the individual.

Other additions
In general, relatively few prayers are added onto Maariv.  On Festivals, some communities recite piyyutim called Maarivim during the blessings of Shema; in many communities, these piyyutim are omitted when the Festival falls on the Sabbath. On Simchat Torah, the Torah is read during Maariv in many communities. On Purim, the Book of Esther is read, followed by V'Ata Kadosh, and on Tish'a Ba'av the Book of Lamentations and some kinnot are recited, also followed by V'Ata Kadosh. On Yom Kippur, an extended order of Selichot is recited; in Ashkenazic communities, this is followed by Avinu Malkeinu (except on the Sabbath). On both Rosh Hashanah and Yom Kippur, many congregations recite Psalm 24.

See also
Shacharit
 Mandaean prayer at evening
Mincha
Mussaf
Ne'ila
Maghrib
Maariv (newspaper)

Notes

References